The 2021–22 Tulane Green Wave men's basketball team represented Tulane University during the 2021–22 NCAA Division I men's basketball season. The Green Wave, led by third-year head coach Ron Hunter, played their home games at Devlin Fieldhouse in New Orleans, Louisiana as seventh-year members of the American Athletic Conference. They finished the season 14–15, 10–8 in AAC Play to finish in 5th place. They defeated Temple in the quarterfinals of the AAC tournament before losing in the semifinals to Houston.

Previous season
In a season limited due to the ongoing COVID-19 pandemic, the Green Wave 10–13, 4–13 in AAC play to finish in 10th place. In the AAC tournament, they defeated Tulsa in the first round before losing to Houston in the quarterfinals.

Offseason

Departures

Incoming Transfers

2021 recruiting class
There were no incoming recruits for the class of 2021.

Roster

Schedule and results

|-
!colspan=12 style=| Exhibition

|-
!colspan=12 style=| Non-conference regular season

|-
!colspan=12 style=| AAC Regular Season

|-
!colspan=12 style=| AAC tournament

Source

References

Tulane Green Wave men's basketball seasons
Tulane
Tulane
Tulane